The 1969 Arkansas State Indians football team represented Arkansas State University as a member of the Southland Conference during the 1969 NCAA College Division football season. Led by seventh-year head coach Bennie Ellender, Arkansas State compiled an overall record of 8–1–1 with mark of 4–0 in conference play, winning the Southland title for the second consecutive season. The Indians were invited to the Pecan Bowl, where they beat .

Schedule

References

Arkansas State
Arkansas State Red Wolves football seasons
Southland Conference football champion seasons
Arkansas State Indians football